Biebersteinia is a genus containing five species, of herbs in the flowering plant order Sapindales. They occur from East Mediterranean to West Siberia and Central Asia. They are normally stemless and have tuberous rhizomes.

In 1806, Christian Friedrich Stephan formed the genus Biebersteinia, then in 1841 Endlicher converted it to a family status. This was the start of various changes to the genus. It was then placed in Geraniaceae by Pierre Edmond Boissier, in 1867, and changed by various botanists (including Knuth (1912), Thorne (1992), Cronquist (1981, 1988), Dahlgren (1989) and Takhtajan (1987 and 1997)).

In 2007, molecular phylogenetic studies have given it a basal position within Sapindales. In the APG III system and in the Kubitzki system, it is placed in its own monogeneric family, Biebersteiniaceae, one of the few herbaceous members of Sapindales (the others being found in Rutaceae).

The name refers to a German botanist Friedrich August Marschall von Bieberstein (1768–1826).

In 2001, five types of flavonoids have been derived from extracts from Biebersteinia orphanidis leaves.

Species 
 Biebersteinia emodii Jaub. & Spach
 Biebersteinia heterostemon Maxim.
 Biebersteinia multifida DC.
 Biebersteinia odora Stephan ex Fisch.
 Biebersteinia orphanidis Boiss.

References

External links

Biebersteiniaceae of Mongolia in FloraGREIF

Sapindales
Sapindales genera